Jack Clarke (born Kisumu, 2 September 1968) is a former Irish rugby union international player who played as a winger. He played for Dolphin RFC and for Munster.
He played for the Ireland team from 1991 to 1992, winning 6 caps and scoring one try. He was a member of the Ireland squad at the 1991 Rugby World Cup.

References

External links
ESPN Profile

1968 births
Living people
Irish rugby union players
Ireland international rugby union players
Rugby union wings